Thuridilla hopei is a species of sacoglossan sea slug, a shell-less marine opisthobranch gastropod mollusks in the family Plakobranchidae.

Distribution 
The type locality for this marine species is Nice, France, in the Mediterranean Sea. This species is also found off Spain, Portugal and Greece. It is found in the benthic zone in subtropical climates.

References

 Gofas, S.; Le Renard, J.; Bouchet, P. (2001). Mollusca, in: Costello, M.J. et al. (Ed.) (2001). European register of marine species: a check-list of the marine species in Europe and a bibliography of guides to their identification. Collection Patrimoines Naturels, 50: pp. 180–213

External links 

 Sea Slug Forum info
 

Plakobranchidae
Gastropods described in 1853